Alverà is an Italian surname. Notable people with the surname include:

Albino Alverà (1923–2004), Italian alpine skier
Claudia Alverà (born 1966), Italian curler
Eleonora Alverà (born 1982), Italian curler
Fabio Alverà (born 1959), Italian curler and curling coach
Giorgio Alverà (1943–2013), Italian bobsledder
Isidoro Alverà (born 1945), Italian ice hockey player
Marco Alverà (born 1975), Italian businessman and CEO of Snam
Massimo Alverà (born 1957), Italian curler
Michele Alverà (1929–1991), Italian bobsledder
Renzo Alverà (1933–2005), Italian bobsledder
Silvio Alverà (1921–1986), Italian alpine skier

Places
Alverà, Italy, a frazione in Cortina d'Ampezzo, Veneto, Italy

Italian-language surnames